WQHH (96.5 FM), branded "Power 96.5" is a commercial FM radio station located in DeWitt, a suburb of Lansing, Michigan.  The station broadcasts with 6,000 watts. The station plays hip hop as well as rhythm & blues (R&B) music.

WQHH began broadcasting on May 26, 1991 with 3,000 watts. Power was increased to the present 6,000 watts in July, 2003.

In 2006, MacDonald Broadcasting purchased WQHH and sister station WXLA for $3.65 million. The studios were moved from DeWitt to Lansing at that time.  MacDonald Broadcasting also replaced the local morning hosts with the Tom Joyner Show. In October 2008, the Rickey Smiley Morning Show took over the morning slot, replacing Tom Joyner. Beginning April 3, 2017, The Breakfast Club is now the morning show from 6-10am on weekdays.

Sources
Michiguide.com - WQHH History

External links

Urban contemporary radio stations in the United States
QHH-FM
Radio stations established in 1991